The Colorado–Nebraska football rivalry is an American college football rivalry between the Colorado Buffaloes and Nebraska Cornhuskers. The teams first played in 1898, and began competing annually as conference opponents in 1948. The rivalry intensified in the 1980s as Colorado improved under head coach Bill McCartney, reaching its peak in the 1990s with several top-ten meetings. Conference realignment placed the teams in the same division, where they continued to meet annually through 2010, after which Colorado moved to the Pac-10 and Nebraska moved to the Big Ten.

The rivalry's intensity was often disputed; while Colorado generally viewed Nebraska as its biggest rival, Nebraska historically viewed Oklahoma as its most significant rival. After the formation of the Big 12, the game was traditionally played on the Friday afternoon following Thanksgiving, nationally televised on ABC. In the Big Eight, this timeslot was typically used for Nebraska's games against Oklahoma.

Series history
Colorado and Nebraska met six times from 1898 to 1907, then didn't meet again until Colorado joined the Big Seven Conference in 1948. From 1948 to 1961, Colorado went 9–4–1 against Nebraska. After their 7–0 victory in Lincoln in 1961, Colorado gained their only series lead (10–9–1).

After seven straight losing seasons, Nebraska hired Bob Devaney in 1962; they quickly returned to national prominence, winning national championships in 1970 and 1971. Devaney went 10–1 against Colorado; his successor Tom Osborne won his first thirteen games against Colorado, and went  against the Buffaloes.

When Colorado hired Bill McCartney in 1982, he emphatically designated Nebraska as their primary rival in an attempt to motivate his team and fanbase. At the time, Nebraska was an established national powerhouse and had defeated Colorado fourteen consecutive times; McCartney wanted to use an eventual defeat of Nebraska as a measure of Colorado's success. Four years later, in 1986, CU got their first win over the Cornhuskers in nineteen years, upsetting No. 3 Nebraska 20–10. It was also CU's first win over Nebraska in Boulder since 1960.

Colorado's success under McCartney led to the peak of the rivalry's national prominence. After their 1986 victory, CU repeatedly threatened Nebraska in the late 1980s, culminating in 1989, when No. 3 Nebraska met No. 2 Colorado at Folsom Field in a de facto Big Eight title game. Colorado won 27–21, giving them their first conference title since they shared it with Oklahoma and Oklahoma State in 1976. The following year, No. 9 Colorado defeated No. 3 Nebraska 27–12 in Lincoln en route to a share of the national championship. Historically, the series was often one-sided, with Nebraska winning 32 of the first 44 matchups. However, the series became far more competitive after McCartney became CU's head coach in 1982. Both teams were ranked in each game from 1988 to 1996, and both were in the top ten in five of those meetings. In 1989 and 1994, Colorado and Nebraska met ranked No. 2 and No. 3 respectively, and split those games. McCartney retired in 1994, but the series remained close; Nebraska won all five games from 1996 to 2000 by just 15 points combined. Since McCartney's first game in 1982, Nebraska is 21–9–1 against Colorado; however, since Nebraska's nine-game winning streak against Colorado from 1992 to 2000, the last 12 games in the series have been an even 6–6 split.

One of the rivalry's most memorable games occurred in 2001, when No. 2 Nebraska visited No. 14 Colorado to decide the Big 12 North championship. Colorado won 62–36, and won the Big 12 Championship Game the following week. Nebraska controversially edged Colorado and Oregon to play #1 Miami in the national championship game.

The annual series ended in 2011 when Nebraska joined the Big Ten (Colorado moved to the Pac-12 shortly after). Nebraska has since been scheduled to face both Iowa and Minnesota on the Friday after Thanksgiving; Colorado played Utah the same day in 2011 and 2012, but in 2013 the game moved to the Saturday after Thanksgiving.

On February 7, 2013, Colorado and Nebraska announced that they agreed to play a four-game series in 2018, 2019, 2023, and 2024. The rivalry was renewed on September 8, 2018, in Lincoln; Colorado won 33–28 on a 40-yard touchdown pass from Steven Montez to Laviska Shenault with 1:06 left to spoil Scott Frost's debut as Nebraska head coach. The September 7, 2019 game at Folsom Field in Boulder saw CU rally from a 17–0 halftime deficit to upset No. 25 Nebraska 34–31 in the first overtime game in the series since 1999.

Bison head trophy
From 1951 to 1961, Nebraska's Innocents Society and Colorado's Heart and Dagger Society exchanged a mounted buffalo head, nicknamed Mr. Chip. This exchange was similar to the Missouri–Nebraska Bell exchanged between the Innocents Society and Missouri's QEBH Society. Colorado lost the trophy after winning it in 1961 and were not able to present it for exchange when Nebraska won in 1962.

Game results

See also  
 List of NCAA college football rivalry games

References

College football rivalries in the United States
Colorado Buffaloes football
Nebraska Cornhuskers football